Sanayee Development Organization (SDO) is an Afghan non-governmental organization. It is headquartered in Kabul, Afghanistan. SDO's programs focus on community-based peace building, education, civil society development and community health in 12 provinces of Afghanistan.

History
In 1990, Raz Dalili founded the Sanayee Development Organization (SDO)  to support peace building efforts for Afghan refugees in Peshawar. In 1992, he expanded its service and relocated to Afghanistan with the mission to reduce violence and promote peace and social cohesion in Afghan communities.

References

External links 
 Sanayee Development Organization Official website
 Resource on local peace building around the world

Non-profit organisations based in Afghanistan